Richard Hartmann (born November 7, 1975) is a Slovak former professional ice hockey forward who last played for the Braehead Clan in the Elite Ice Hockey League as player/assistant coach. He was previously the player-coach with the Edinburgh Capitals from 2011-2015 and is currently the head coach of the Dundee Comets.

Hartmann spent most of his playing career with HK 36 Skalica.

Career statistics

References

External links
 

1975 births
Living people
Braehead Clan players
Edinburgh Capitals players
Ice hockey player-coaches
Idaho Steelheads (WCHL) players
HK 36 Skalica players
HK Nitra players
MKS Cracovia (ice hockey) players
Lausitzer Füchse players
Nipawin Hawks players
Slovak ice hockey forwards
Ice hockey people from Bratislava
Slovak expatriate sportspeople in Scotland
Expatriate ice hockey players in Scotland
Slovak expatriate ice hockey players in Germany
Expatriate ice hockey players in Poland